The 2017–18 Primera Divisió, also known as Lliga Multisegur Assegurances, was the 23rd season of top-tier football in Andorra. The season began on 17 September 2017 and ended on 20 May 2018. The defending champions are FC Santa Coloma having won their eleventh championship the previous season. 

The winner of the league this season will earn a place in the preliminary round of the 2018–19 Champions League, and the second-placed club will earn a place in the preliminary round of the 2018–19 Europa League.

Teams
Inter Club d'Escaldes earned a place in the Primera Divisió this season by winning the 2016–17 Segona Divisió. Penya Encarnada will join them after defeating Ordino in a play-off.

Clubs and locations

Regular season

League table

Results
The eight clubs will play each other three times for twenty–one matches each during the regular season.

Championship and relegation round
Records earned in the regular season were taken over to the Championship round and relegation round.

Championship round

Relegation round

Primera Divisió play-offs
The seventh-placed club (third-placed in the relegation round), Encamp, from the 2017–18 Primera Divisió and the runners-up from the 2017–18 Segona Divisió, Atlètic Club d'Escaldes, played in a two-legged relegation play-off for one place in the 2018–19 Primera Divisió.

Season statistics

Regular season top goalscorers

Regular season top goalkeepers

Championship round top goalscorers

Relegation round top goalscorers

References

External links
  
uefa.com
soccerway.com

Primera Divisió seasons
Andorra
2017–18 in Andorran football